Sylvia Mitchell (born 13 October 1937) is an Australian athlete. She competed in the women's long jump at the 1960 Summer Olympics.

References

1937 births
Living people
Athletes (track and field) at the 1960 Summer Olympics
Australian female long jumpers
Olympic athletes of Australia
Place of birth missing (living people)